Alliance High School is a public alternative high school in Portland, Oregon, United States.

Programs
It is composed of four programs: FOCUS @ Madison, Meek Professional Technical, Marshall Night, and Portland Night @ Benson.

Academics
In 2008, 19% of the school's seniors received a high school diploma. Of 150 students, 29 graduated, 63 dropped out, and 58 were still in high school the following year.

In October 2009 the school was removed from the No Child Left Behind safety watch list, due to the following not occurring: "more than 1 percent of their students brought a weapon to school, were expelled for violence or committed a violent crime on campus."

References

High schools in Portland, Oregon
Alternative schools in Oregon
Public high schools in Oregon
Portland Public Schools (Oregon)